Néstor Alonso (born 25 May 1941) is a Spanish bobsledder. He competed in the four-man event at the 1968 Winter Olympics.

References

1941 births
Living people
Spanish male bobsledders
Olympic bobsledders of Spain
Bobsledders at the 1968 Winter Olympics
Sportspeople from Barcelona